The women's floor competition at the 2012 Summer Olympics in London was held at the North Greenwich Arena on 7 August.

Format of competition

The top eight competitors in the qualification phase (with a limit of two per country) advanced to the final. Qualification scores were then ignored, with only final-round scores counting.

Final results

Qualification results

Oldest and youngest competitors

References

Gymnastics at the 2012 Summer Olympics
2012
2012 in women's gymnastics
Women's events at the 2012 Summer Olympics